BSPP is a compound used in scientific research which acts as a positive allosteric modulator at the GABAB receptor. It has a synergistic effect with GABAB agonists such as baclofen at GABAB autoreceptors but not heteroreceptors, suggesting it may be useful for distinguishing between these GABAB receptor subtypes.

References

Phenols
Primary alcohols
GABAB receptor positive allosteric modulators
Tert-butyl compounds
Cyclopentanes